The 1935 Washington State Cougars football team was an American football team that represented Washington State College during the 1935 college football season. Tenth-year head coach Babe Hollingbery led the team to a 3–2 mark in the Pacific Coast Conference (PCC) and 5–3–1 overall.

The Cougars played their four home games on campus at Rogers Field in Pullman, Washington, with a road game in nearby Moscow against Palouse rival Idaho.

Schedule

References

External links
 Game program: Puget Sound at WSC – September 28, 1935
 Game program: Willamette at WSC – October 5, 1935
 Game program: Washington at WSC – October 19, 1935
 Game program: Gonzaga at WSC – November 2, 1935

Washington State
Washington State Cougars football seasons
Washington State Cougars football